The Garcelon Civic Centre is a multi-purpose sporting facility in St. Stephen, New Brunswick, Canada. It includes an NHL sized hockey arena, a 25-metre swimming pool, a walking/running track, and a leisure/therapeutic swimming pool.

References

External links
Garcelon Civic Centre

Indoor arenas in New Brunswick
Indoor ice hockey venues in Canada
Sports venues in New Brunswick
St. Stephen, New Brunswick